The Ulster Minor Club Football Championship, often referred to as the St. Paul's Tournament, is the 38th annual Gaelic football tournament for players aged under eighteen.

Minor club championships are held in each of the nine counties of Ulster. The nine county champions contest the Ulster Club Championship. All matches are knock-out.

The 2022 winners were Dungiven of County Derry who defeated Four Masters of Donegal by 2-07 to 1-08 in the final on 1 January 2023.

The tournament is organised and hosted by St. Paul's GAC, Belfast. While unofficial, it is regarded as the Ulster Club Championship for club minor teams. It began in 1982 and the Jimmy McConville cup has been presented since 1983. The competition begins in late November or early December with the final taking place in January, typically on New Year's Day (e.g. the 2017 final took place on 1 January 2018).

Finals Listed By Year

Notes:
The Anne Marie Donnelly award is given to the man of the match in the final

Wins Listed By County

Wins Listed By Club

See also
Ulster Senior Club Football Championship

References

4